Uram is a surname. Notable people with the surname include:

Andy Uram (1915–1984), American football player
Marek Uram (born 1974), Slovak ice hockey player
Mihail Uram (born 1924), Hungarian footballer
Paul Uram (1926–2017), American gymnastics and flexibility coach

See also
Uran (name)